Two ship of the Royal Navy has borne the name HMS Burges,

  was a Captain-class frigate. She was launched in 1943, returned to the US Navy in 1945 and scrapped in 1946.

Royal Navy ship names